Sara Maria Danius (5 April 1962 – 12 October 2019) was a Swedish literary critic and philosopher, and a scholar of literature and aesthetics. Danius was professor of aesthetics at Södertörn University, docent of literature at Uppsala University and professor in literary science at Stockholm University.

Danius was a member of the Swedish Academy and its first female permanent secretary. She was one of the central figures in the 2018 controversies resulting in the cancellation of the Nobel Prize in Literature that year and the following restructuring of the academy.

Early life and education 
Danius was the daughter of author Anna Wahlgren (1942-2022) and Lars Danius (1907–1996). She was the oldest of nine full and half siblings. She went to Åva gymnasium in Täby, where she studied natural science. She played basketball in Elitserien, the highest league in Sweden, and continued to play on a recreational level throughout her life. In 1981–82, she worked as a certified croupier and dealer at casinos in Stockholm.

Danius graduated from Stockholm University in 1986. She received her Master of Arts in critical theory at the University of Nottingham in 1989. She lived in the United States for ten years and, in 1997, received a PhD from Duke University. In 1999 she received a PhD from Uppsala University. She published on the relationship between literature and society and wrote about Marcel Proust, Gustave Flaubert, and James Joyce.

Career 
Danius was a literary critic for the Swedish daily newspaper Dagens Nyheter from 1986. In 2008, she became professor of aesthetics at Södertörn University and docent of literature at Uppsala University. She was an executive member of the Royal Swedish Academy of Letters since 2010, and in 2013 became professor in literary science at Stockholm University.

In March 2013, Danius was elected to the Swedish Academy, succeeding Knut Ahnlund on chair 7. Danius was formally installed in the academy at a ceremony on 20 December 2013. She took over the post as permanent secretary of the academy from Peter Englund on 1 June 2015.

She played a central role in awarding the literature Nobel to Bob Dylan. This was the first time a musician and songwriter won the Nobel Prize in Literature. The award caused some controversy, particularly among writers arguing that the literary merits of Dylan's work are not equal to those of some of his peers.

She was asked to resign from her position and left the academy on 12 April 2018, against the background of critique over the academy's handling of the Me Too-related Jean-Claude Arnault scandal. The scandal evolved into the 2018 controversies resulting in the cancellation of the Nobel Prize in Literature that year and the following restructuring of the academy.

Two former permanent secretaries, Sture Allén and Horace Engdahl, called Danius a weak leader in her handling of the affair. On 26 February 2019 she resigned from her seat at the Swedish Academy. Her move came after several academy members tried to sweep the scandal under the rug, prompting the resignation of three academy members "in disgust."

Personal life 
Danius was interested in fashion. At the Nobel Banquets she wore specially designed dresses by Pär Engsheden and inspired by three authors she admired: Marcel Proust, Honoré de Balzac and Virginia Woolf. Her signature garment, a pussy bow blouse, became a symbol to wear for those who supported her during the Swedish Academy crisis.

From 1989 to 2010, she was married to author Stefan Jonsson. They had a son named Leo.

Danius died on 12 October 2019, aged 57, after having suffered from breast cancer for several years.

Bibliography 
Försök om litteratur, Stockholm: Bonnier, 1998. .
Prousts motor, Stockholm: Bonnier, 2000. .
The senses of modernism: technology, perception, and aesthetics, Ithaca: Cornell University Press, 2002. .
The prose of the world: Flaubert and the art of making things visible, Uppsala: Acta Universitatis Upsaliensis, 2006. 
Voices: contemporary ceramic art from Sweden, Stockholm: Carlsson, 2006. .
Proust-Benjamin : om fotografin, 2011. .
Näsa för nyheter : essä om James Joyce, 2013. .
Den blå tvålen: Romanen och konsten att göra saker och ting synliga, 2013. .
Husmoderns död och andra texter, Stockholm: Bonnier, 2014. .
Om Bob Dylan, 2018. .

References

Further reading 
 

1962 births
2019 deaths
20th-century Swedish philosophers
21st-century Swedish philosophers
Swedish women philosophers
20th-century Swedish writers
21st-century Swedish writers
20th-century Swedish women writers
21st-century Swedish women writers
Alumni of the University of Nottingham
Articles containing video clips
Deaths from breast cancer
Deaths from cancer in Sweden
Duke University alumni
Members of the Swedish Academy
People from Täby Municipality
Philosophers of art
Academic staff of Södertörn University
Academic staff of Stockholm University
Stockholm University alumni
Swedish literary critics
Swedish women literary critics
Swedish women academics
Swedish women's basketball players
Uppsala University alumni
Academic staff of Uppsala University